Taking Snapshots (or Taking Snapshots Vol. 1) is the debut studio album of Luc van Acker, self-released in 1982. The album was reissued on CD by Hard Records in 1994 and Fifth Colvmn Records on May 16, 1995. In 2009 the album was reissued for the first time since its release on vinyl record by Kindred Spirits.

Music
The album was recorded and mixed by van Acker at the age of eighteen on a TASCAM 244 cassette recorder in his bedroom. The music was inspired by the calligraphy of Buddhist monks and each track recorded in a single tack.

Reception

Sonic Boom compared the music to Kraftwerk or Cabaret Voltaire and said "Luc van Acker was truly a man ahead of his time and it is a shame that his music did not see a wide spread release at the time it was written."

Track listing

Personnel
Adapted from the Taking Snapshots liner notes.

Musicians
 Luc van Acker – instruments, recording, mixing, photography

Production and design
 After Hours (1996 reissue) – design
 Zalman Fishman (1996 reissue) – executive-production
 Jimmy Machon (1994 reissue) – art direction, design

Release history

References

External links 
 
 

1982 debut albums
Luc van Acker albums
Fifth Colvmn Records albums